1957 in philosophy

Events 
 Albert Camus was awarded the Nobel Prize in Literature.

Publications 
 Karl Jaspers, The Great Philosophers (originally published in German as Die großen Philosophen, 1957)
 Paul Tillich, Dynamics of Faith (1957)
 Bernard Lonergan, Insight: A Study of Human Understanding (1957)
 B. F. Skinner, Verbal Behavior (1957)
 Leopold Kohr, The Breakdown of Nations (1957)
 André Leroi-Gourhan, Prehistoric Man (1957)
 Northrop Frye, Anatomy of Criticism (1957)
 Noam Chomsky, Syntactic Structures (1957)

Philosophical fiction 
 Ayn Rand, Atlas Shrugged (1957)
 Max Frisch, Homo Faber (1957)

Births

Deaths 
 October 13 - Erich Auerbach (born 1892)

References 

Philosophy
20th-century philosophy
Philosophy by year